This page documents the tornadoes and tornado outbreaks of 1946, primarily in the United States. Most recorded tornadoes form in the U.S., although some events may take place internationally. Tornado statistics for older years like this often appear significantly lower than modern years due to fewer reports or confirmed tornadoes.

All documented significant tornadoes prior to 1950 in the United States were given unofficial ratings by tornado experts like Thomas P. Grazulis, which this article uses for the ratings below. Most of these records are limited to significant tornadoes; those rated F2 or higher on the Fujita scale, or which caused a fatality. Some listed events were tornado families rather than single tornadoes. There are also no official tornado counts for each month, so not every month is included in this article. In subsequent years, the documentation of tornadoes became much more widespread and efficient, with the average annual tornado count being around 1,253. Outside the United States, various meteorological organizations, like the European Severe Storms Laboratory rated tornadoes, which are considered official ratings.

Events

United States yearly total

January

January 4

A small but violent tornado outbreak occurred in Texas, killing 30 people and injuring at least 351 others. L. H. Seamon with the U.S. Weather Bureau, the predecessor of the National Weather Service, later stated this was the "most disastrous" tornado event of the year. Just to the east, the tornado destroyed a farm house were two more injuries occurred.

Later in the day, a large, intense F3 tornado struck the community of Clawson, where it destroyed 30 homes. This tornado killed three people, with the fatalities occurring in two of the destroyed homes in Clawson. Along the tornado's  path, it damaged 375 structures, with 48 having been destroyed. This large and violent, F4 tornado moved through the city of Nacogdoches, where it destroyed 80 homes and damaged 150 others. In Nacogdoches, 75 people were hospitalized and six people were killed on the west side of the city. The tornado continued on into Appleby, where it continued to destroy dozens of structures and kill three people on the northeast side of the town. Outside of Nacogdoches, 300 other structures were damaged or destroyed by the tornado and "several thousand acres of forest were flattened". This tornado killed a total of ten people, with one fatality having no information provided from Thomas P. Grazulis and a total of 200 people were injured.

Minutes after the Nacogdoches tornado touched down, a brief F2 tornado struck Peniel, where over 100 buildings were impacted by the tornado, with eleven being destroyed. Seventeen people were injured by this tornado. At the same time as the Peniel tornado, a second violent tornado touched down in Anderson County. The tornado first struck the area around Log Lake, where two people were killed. The tornado then continued on into the Southview community, located just south of downtown Palestine. The tornado hit 158 structures, with 36 homes being destroyed. Thirteen fatalities occurred in seven of the destroyed homes. Cars were thrown for several hundred yards. In Southview, sixty injuries were treated at a hospital, and more injuries probably occurred. Minutes after the Southview tornado, an F2 tornado struck the St. Paul—Shiloh area in Limeston County, where nine homes were destroyed and two people were killed.

January 5–6

On January 5, a tornado struck near Waynesboro, causing minor property damage. On January 6, a large, long-tracked, violent F4 tornado impacted Ashley and Chicot Counties in Arkansas. Near Wilmot, over 20 plantations were completely destroyed and three homes were blown into Lake Chicot. The tornado killed three people and injured 50 others. On the same day, two intense F3 tornadoes struck in Mississippi. The four fatalities occurred in three of a dozen small homes that were destroyed. On the north side of Indianola, two people were killed in a church that was completely destroyed. A third fatality occurred in a nearby home that was also completely destroyed. The fourth fatality occurred when the tornado destroyed a small home northwest of Sunflower.

January 8
At least two homes were unroofed.

February

February 4 (United Kingdom)

A tornado, rated F2/T4 by the European Severe Storms Laboratory struck Birmingham, England. It was noted that a damage survey was conducted by a “severe weather expert” with no further information given.

February 13

Early on February 13, an F3 tornado struck the eastern portion of Ardmore, in Oklahoma. The damage was estimated up to $1.5 million (1946 USD). Later in the day, an F2 tornado struck a rural community east of Cedartown, Georgia.

February 27

One February 27, an F2 tornado injured three people as it struck Terrace Park, a neighborhood in Tampa, Florida, where one home was destroyed, and a nearby home was unroofed.

March

March 15
An F2 tornado struck near Kewanee, in Mississippi, where it injured one person and destroyed a small home, a church, and multiple barns.

March 22

Damage was estimated at $150,000 (1946 USD).

March 25
This tornado did not receive an estimated rating on the Fujita scale from Thomas P. Grazulis, meaning it was believed to have been F0 or F1 intensity.

March 26
The tornado damaged multiple structures and a truck in Louisiana. “Considerable damage” occurred in Grand Cane. This tornado did not receive an estimated rating on the Fujita scale from Thomas P. Grazulis, which means it was believed to have been F0 or F1 intensity.

March 27
A -wide F2 tornado struck just east of Houston, Florida, where it destroyed barns and unroofed a school.

April

April 5

April 15
Two tornadoes struck in and around the city of Euless in Texas. This tornado did not receive an estimated rating on the Fujita scale from Thomas P. Grazulis, meaning it was believed to have been F0 or F1 intensity.

April 21
This tornado did not receive an estimated rating on the Fujita scale from Thomas P. Grazulis, meaning it was believed to have been F0 or F1 intensity.

May
There were 35 tornadoes confirmed in the United States in the month of May. This was above the 1916–1945 average for the month of May.

May 10

An F2 tornado injured two people and destroyed two homes northwest of Queen City, Texas. Later in the day, an F3 tornado curved around Eufaula, Oklahoma, where it killed one person, injured five others and damaged or destroyed 18 homes.

May 15–20

A five day tornado outbreak sequence spawned multiple significant tornadoes. On May 15, an F2 tornado unroofed a home southwest of Briscoe, Texas. This same home would later be hit by a tornado in 1965. Later on the 15th, a deadly, violent F4 tornado struck the town of Loraine and the community of Champion. South of Loraine, two homes were destroyed. South of Champion, numerous homes were damaged, and three were leveled southeast of the community, where a woman was killed, and two injuries occurred. Over one hundred sheep and cattle were killed by the tornado. On May 16, an F2 tornado unroofed a large farmhouse and destroyed multiple smaller farmhouses near Sandy Ridge, Alabama. The tornado struck the edge of Norris City, where three homes were nearly leveled, and one fatality occurred. Outside of Norris City, the tornado damaged six homes and twelve barns.

On May 18, two violent and deadly F4 tornadoes struck Texas. The first tornado completely "splintered and scatted" a church in Stoneburg. In the church, a linen scarf was untouched by the tornado as it laid on the pulpit as the church was destroyed. Along the tornado’s  path, multiple homes and barns were damaged or destroyed. At one of the destroyed homes, a man was killed by the tornado, and his wife was severely injured, though it is noted, she may have died from her injuries. Along the path, a "prominent elderly couple" was killed when their new ranch home was leveled along with all of their barns by the tornado northeast of Bowie, Texas. The second tornado struck around the city of Sanger. On the north side of the city, a home was leveled by the tornado, and three other homes were leveled four miles east of the city. On the east side of Sanger, a 9-year-old girl was killed by flying debris as she ran out of a storm cellar. It is noted by Grazulis that both F4 tornadoes are "related," indicating they may have been produced by the same supercell. On May 19, an F2 tornado destroyed a grocery store and unroofed four homes in Morgan City, Louisiana. On May 20, a deadly and long-tracked F3 tornado occurred in North Carolina. The tornado started near Seven Springs, passing near Kinston before ending its  path near Grifton, North Carolina. In total, three homes and twelve barns were completely destroyed by the tornado, and at least 25 other homes were damaged. Near Kinston, two people were killed, and 50 other people were injured along the tornado's track.

May 16 (Spain)

An F1 tornado impacted Port de Sóller, Spain injuring 100 people. The European Severe Storms Laboratory noted that the rating was based on a written account of the damage by Gayà, M.

June

June 1 (Netherlands)
An unrated tornado struck the city of Capelle aan den IJssel in the Netherlands.

June 13 (Europe)

On the same day, two significant tornadoes impacted portions of the Czech Republic. The first F2 tornado struck the villages of Stínava, Vícov, and Ptení. The second F2 tornado struck the village of Čejkovice. On the same day, an unrated tornado struck Graz, Austria.

June 16 (Romania)

A tornado, rated F2 by the European Severe Storms Laboratory (ESSL), struck Bucuresti, Romania. It was noted that the rating was assigned based on a written account of the damage, though no damage was listed by the ESSL.

June 17 (United States and Canada)

A large F4 tornado touched down in River Rouge, Michigan before crossing the Detroit River into Windsor, Ontario, where it caused most of the damage and fatalities before moving into the small town of Tecumseh and dissipating. 17 people were killed, and the tornado holds the record for the strongest tornado to hit Windsor. While the damage in the United States never received a rating on the Fujita scale, Thomas P. Grazulis rated the damage in the United States F3 on the Fujita scale and noted $1 million (1946 USD) in damage occurred on the United States side of this tornado. The exact death toll of this tornado is debated, with some sources saying 15 and others, specifically local newspapers, saying 18.

August

August 17
Two F4 tornadoes occurred in Minnesota.

August 20 (Poland)

A large tornado struck Kłodzko, Poland, with an estimated intensity of F2–F4 on the Fujita scale. A few hours later, a large, deadly tornado, rated F3 by the European Severe Storms Laboratory, struck Stronie Śląskie and Stójków in Poland, killing one person and leaving ten missing. It was also noted that this tornado completely destroyed three villages and left an noticeable scar through a forest. The European Severe Storms Laboratory also noted this may have been the same tornado as the one that struck Kłodzko. In an academically peer reviewed paper published in 2017, the tornado was rated F3/F4.

August 28 (Spain)

A tornado, rated F2 by the European Severe Storms Laboratory (ESSL), struck Caravaca de la Cruz, Spain.

September

September 20 (United Kingdom)

A tornado, rated F1/T3 by the European Severe Storms Laboratory struck Colyford, England. It was noted that a damage survey was conducted by a “severe weather expert” with no further information given.

December

December 28—29

Notes

References 

Torn
Tornado-related lists by year
1946 meteorology
Tornadoes in Poland
Tornadoes in the United States
Tornadoes in Spain
Tornadoes in the United Kingdom
Tornadoes in Romania